Fidinam is a multinational private consultancy company, which was founded in 1960 in Switzerland by Swiss lawyer, politician, and entrepreneur Tito Tettamanti, currently the Honorary Chairman of the Group. Fidinam is based in Ticino (Switzerland)  and with an established team of c. 250 professionals has offices in Europe, Asia, Africa, and Australia. The CEO of Fidinam is Roberto Grassi.

Locations 
Fidinam offices are located in Lugano (headquarters), Bellinzona, Mendrisio, Zurich, Geneva, Milan, Barcelona, Luxembourg, Principality of Monaco, Hong Kong, Dubai, Sydney, Singapore, Ho Chi Minh City, and Ebene (Mauritius).

References 

Consulting firms established in 1960
Swiss companies established in 1960
Companies of Switzerland